Lucienne Heurtelou (c. 1921 – May 19, 2006)  was a Haitian diplomat, women's rights advocate, author, and First Lady of Haiti 1946-1950 as the wife of Haitian President Dumarsais Estimé. 

She was honorary President of the Ligue Féminine d'Action sociale (Feminine League for Social Action), an influential Haitian feminist organization created in 1934, during its First Congress of Haitian Women (April 14–19, 1950).  The Congress attracted delegates of 44 Haitian women's organizations and 32 delegates of 17 international women's organizations and relaunched the Haitian women's movement for equal rights.  In October 1948, she inaugurated an orphanage in Truittier, near Carrefour, which was never completed. She is the first Haitian First Lady to have written her memoirs, a book  in which she delves into the undoing of her husband's presidency by his political enemies.

She became Haiti's first female ambassador to Belgium after her husband's death in 1953.

She was the mother of former Haitian government official Jean-Robert Estimé.

She died on May 19, 2006 at age 85, gunned down in the robbery of the jewelry store  of the Daccaret family on Dufort street in Port-au-Prince.

References

2006 deaths
First ladies and gentlemen of Haiti
Ambassadors of Haiti to Belgium
Haitian women diplomats
Year of birth uncertain
1920s births
Women ambassadors
20th-century diplomats
Deaths by firearm in Haiti